Alton Rollon Romine (December 11, 1930 – September 30, 2015) was a gridiron football defensive back and a halfback in the National Football League (NFL), the Canadian Football League (CFL), the Ontario Rugby Football Union (ORFU), and American Football League (AFL). He played for the NFL's Chicago Bears (1955) and Green Bay Packers (1955, 1958); the CFL's Toronto Argonauts (1956) and Ottawa Rough Riders (1959); the ORFU's Kitchener-Waterloo Dutchmen (1957), and the AFL's Denver Broncos (1960) and Boston Patriots (1961). Romine played collegiate ball for the University of North Alabama before playing professionally for 8 seasons. He retired from football in 1961. In 1963, he became the head coach of the Huntsville Rockets of the Southern Professional Football League. He died in 2015.

References

1930 births
2015 deaths
Sportspeople from Florence, Alabama
Players of American football from Alabama
American football defensive backs
American football halfbacks
North Alabama Lions football players
Chicago Bears players
Green Bay Packers players
American players of Canadian football
Canadian football defensive backs
Canadian football running backs
Toronto Argonauts players
Ottawa Rough Riders players
Denver Broncos (AFL) players
Boston Patriots players
Ontario Rugby Football Union players
American Football League players